Octolepis is a genus of flowering plants belonging to the family Thymelaeaceae.

Its native range is Western and Western Central Tropical Africa, Madagascar.

Species:

Octolepis aymoniniana 
Octolepis casearia 
Octolepis decalepis 
Octolepis dioica 
Octolepis ibityensis 
Octolepis oblanceolata 
Octolepis ratovosonii

References

Thymelaeaceae
Malvales genera